Courtney Guard (née Stubbs, born 26 September 1991) is a retired Australian rules footballer who played for Fremantle and West Coast in the AFL Women's (AFLW). 

Guard was drafted by Fremantle with their fourth selection and thirty-ninth overall in the 2018 AFL Women's draft.

At the end of the 2019 season, Guard was recruited by West Coast for their inaugural season in 2020.

In May 2022, Guard retired to focus on her career and new role as Head of Sport at Perth College.

A school teacher, Guard was previously a 100m hurdler and basketball player.

References

External links 

1991 births
Living people
Fremantle Football Club (AFLW) players
Australian rules footballers from Western Australia
West Coast Eagles (AFLW) players